The N class were 12 steam locomotives that operated on the national rail network of New Zealand.  They were built in three batches, including one batch of two engines for the private Wellington and Manawatu Railway Company, the WMR, by the Baldwin Locomotive Works in 1885, 1891, and 1901.  Previously the N class designation had been applied between 1877 and 1879 to Lady Mordaunt, a member of the B class of 1874.

Construction
Despite the Long Depression of the 1880s, the young New Zealand railway network continued to expand and additional motive power was required.  The New Zealand Railways Department had normally ordered locomotives from England up until this time, though it had previously bought locomotives from United States manufacturers (such as the Rogers K class), and in 1885 it placed an order with Baldwin, whose first New Zealand locomotives were the T class, to construct the six original members of the N class, which entered service between October and December 1885.

Six years later the WMR required additional motive power to handle the growing traffic on their line from Wellington to Longburn, just south of Palmerston North.  Its typical supplier of equipment was Baldwin, who offered the WMR a locomotive similar to the N class.  The WMR ordered two such locomotives and they entered service as Nos. 9 and 10.  They proved to be more efficient than the 1885 batch, and in an attempt to match these efficiencies the government converted N 27 into a Vauclain compound, but with little success.

In 1901, the government ordered four similar locomotives.

Subclasses
Two sub-classes of the N class existed, both Baldwin Vauclain compounds built for the WMR.  Nos. 14 and 15 were a heavier and more powerful version of the N class and became the NA class; Nos. 5 and 18 had wider fireboxes and became the NC class.

Operation
The 1885 batch operated in the Hutt Valley and the Wairarapa; the 1901 batch around Auckland. Around 1900 they were used on the Napier Express coupled with an (rather ineffectual) M class loco; the duo was called a  'en and chicken. 

In 1908 the WMR was nationalised and incorporated into the government's network. The two ex-WMR Ns continued to work on their home route until World War I, when they were transferred to Westland to operate the mail trains between Greymouth and Otira, making full use of their speed.  In the 1920s the two were modified for shunting duties, including the addition of a tender cab and side ladders on the tender.

A world record
The most outstanding operational feat by an N class locomotive occurred on 20 July 1892.  WMR No. 10 departed Wellington with a special test train, and gradually picked up speed on the flat trackage of the Kapiti Coast and Horowhenua.  It ran comfortably at speeds of 50-55 mph, and between Levin and Shannon it reached 64.4 mph (103.6 km/h), then the world speed record on  narrow gauge track.

Withdrawal
By the 1920s withdrawal was seriously considered.  The first two were withdrawn in November 1926; the boiler from WMR No. 9/N 453, withdrawn on 13 November 1926, was re-used on WB 300 when it was overhauled, distinguishing it from others of its class.  Three more were withdrawn in March 1927, and N 27, the first member of the class, followed in November of that year.  Record-setting WMR No. 10/N 454 was also meant to be withdrawn in 1927 but was given a reprieve: its crews formally complained about its poor condition and it ceased service on 30 January 1928.  It was stripped of useful parts and sat in Greymouth yard until it was officially written off on 31 March 1928.  It was dumped in the Waimakariri River as a means of stabilising the riverbank.  The last N was taken out of service in March 1934.

Preservation
None of the N class were saved for preservation - they were withdrawn at least two decades before the preservation movement had even seriously begun.  However, the skeleton of WMR No. 9/N 453 was discovered near Arthur's Pass, dumped in the Bealey River, and it was recovered by the Wellington and Manawatu Railway Trust in stages between 2003 and 2006 with the aim of restoring it to full operational condition.  On 27 February 2007, No. 9 returned to its old home of Paekakariki and is now based at the depot of Steam Incorporated, where it is undergoing restoration to working order.

By May 2009, No.9's tender had been dismantled, and the frames and bogies overhauled and reassembled.

Railway enthusiasts have also attempted to find the remnants of WMR No. 10/N 454 but have not yet had success.

See also
 Locomotives of New Zealand

References

Bibliography 

Heath, Eric, and Stott, Bob; Classic Steam Locomotives Of New Zealand, Grantham House, 1993

External links
Drawing of a WMR N, by Derek Brown
Drawing of an NZR N, by Derek Brown
Wellington and Manawatu Railway Trust's restoration of WMR 9

N class
2-6-2 locomotives
Baldwin locomotives
Railway locomotives introduced in 1885
3 ft 6 in gauge locomotives of New Zealand